The South American Gymnastics Confederation (CONSUGI) organizes South American Gymnastics Championships in different disciplines of gymnastics: men's and women's artistic gymnastics, rhythmic gymnastics, trampoline and tumbling, as well as aerobic gymnastics.

History
The first edition of the South American Artistic Gymnastics Championships was held in 1957 in Buenos Aires. It was only the third time a major artistic gymnastics tournament was started in the Americas, after the gymnastics competitions at the Central American and Caribbean Games, first held in 1946, and the gymnastics competitions at the Pan American Games, first held in 1951. At the inaugural edition, in 1957, only men's events were competed. Women's events would be competed for the first time at the second edition of the championships, in 1969.

In 1978, the first edition of the South American Games, then titled the Southern Cross Games, was held in La Paz, Bolivia. One of the sports contested at the tournament was artistic gymnastics, and this served as the continental championships for that year. However, that same year, another edition of the South American Championships was held in Peru only ten days after the conclusion of the gymnastics events at the 1978 Southern Cross Games. In 1982, the gymnastics events at Southern Cross Games also served as the South American Gymnastics Championships for that year. This also seemed to be true in 1986, 1990, 1994, 1998 and 2002. However, in recent years, the gymnastics competitions at the South American Games seem to have been retroactively considered independent events by CONSUGI, since the 2021 South American Artistic Gymnastics Championships are officially considered the 18th edition of the championships.

In 1984, the first South American Championships in rhythmic gymnastics was held in Londrina, Brazil. However, the event was organized for athletes to represent clubs, instead of national committees. The first known event in rhythmic gymnastics where athletes represented their nations was held in 1988 in Rosario, Argentina. Similar to the stance adopted concerning the artistic gymnastics championships, rhythmic gymnastics events at the 1990, 1994, 1998 and 2002 South American Games were once considered part of the South American Championships.

Senior South American Championships have also been organized for aerobic gymnastics and trampoline gymnastics. To date, South American championships in acrobatic gymnastics and in parkour, two other gymnastics disciplines recognized by the International Gymnastics Federation, have not been created.

Senior events

Aerobic gymnastics

Artistic gymnastics

Rhythmic gymnastics

Trampoline and tumbling

Junior events

See also
 Gymnastics at the South American Games
 Pan American Gymnastics Championships

References

 
Gymnastics competitions
C
G
Recurring sporting events established in 1957